Franklin County Jail may refer to:

 Franklin County Jail (Ozark, Arkansas), listed on the NRHP in Arkansas
 Franklin County Jail (Benton, Illinois), in Benton, IL, listed on the NRHP 
 Franklin County Jail (Chambersburg, Pennsylvania), listed on the NRHP in Pennsylvania
 Franklin County Jail (Winchester, Tennessee), listed on the NRHP in Tennessee